Georgy Stepanovich Khizha (born 2 May 1938, in Ashgabat, Turkmen SSR) was a Russian politician and business manager who was one of the Deputy Chairmen of the Government of the Russian Federation during the early years of President Boris Yeltsin's administration.

Early work
A factory manager, by 1990 Khizha was in charge of the "Svetlana" . PJSC Svetlana (Russian: ПАО «Светлана») is a company based in Saint Petersburg, Russian Federation.It is primarily involved in the research, design, and manufacturing of electronic and microelectronic instruments. Svetlana is part of Ruselectronics. The name of the company is said to originate from the words for 'light of an electric lamp' (световые лампочки накаливания). From 1991 until 1992, he served as that city's deputy mayor under Anatoly Sobchak, and proved to be a competent administrator.

Career in government
In May 1992, Khizha was appointed as the Deputy Chairman of the Government of the Russian Federation for the industrial sector, on recommendation to President Boris Yeltsin from Sobchak and Yegor Gaidar. Khizha was also apparently considered as an alternative for the post of acting Prime Minister of Russia, along with fellow vice premier Vladimir Shumeiko, as opposed to Yeltsin's nominee, Gaidar. He was regarded as being a conservative, and his appointment was viewed as a slowdown in economic reforms. During fighting between militants in North Ossetia, President Yeltsin appointed him as the acting governor of the region. During this time, Martin Shakkum, later one of the candidates during the 1996 Russian presidential election, worked with Khizha as his adviser. Due to the negative economic effects of Khizha's proposals, he came into conflict with Anatoly Chubais, in charge of the country's economic policies. He was dismissed from his post in May 1993, lasting a little less than a year.

Sources

References

Books
 
 

1938 births
20th-century Russian politicians
Deputy heads of government of the Russian Federation
Living people
People from Ashgabat
Russian businesspeople
Peter the Great St. Petersburg Polytechnic University alumni
Russian Presidential Academy of National Economy and Public Administration alumni
Businesspeople in technology